Derrick May is the name of:
Derrick May (baseball) (born 1968), American baseball player
Derrick May (musician) (born 1963), American electronic musician

See also
Derrick Mayes (born 1974), former professional American football player